Eleve11 is the third studio album by Sander van Doorn. It was released in September 2011.

Track listing
 "Love Is Darkness (feat. Carol Lee)" – 6:22
 "Koko" – 3:56
 "Believe (feat. Tom Helsen)" – 3:41
 "Nano" – 4:29
 "Rolling The Dice (with Sidney Samson & Nadia Ali)" – 3:50
 "Beyond Sound (The Godskitchen Urban Wave Mix)" – 4:19
 "Timezone (feat. Frederick)" – 6:20
 "Drink To Get Drunk" – 4:16
 "Who's Wearing the Cap (feat. Laidback Luke)" – 3:00
 "Slap My Pitch Up (with Sexy Penguins)" – 5:02
 "Eagles (with Adrian Lux) / Intro (The xx Booty Mix)" – 19:05

Hidden track: when track 11 ends, there is a long silence before the hidden bonus track "Intro (The xx Booty Mix)" (at 13:35) starts.

Charts

References

2011 albums
Sander van Doorn albums